Lycorea halia atergatis, the tropical milkweed butterfly, is a subspecies of Lycorea halia, also called the tropical milkweed butterfly, a nymphalid butterfly family in the Danainae subfamily. It is found from Mexico, Venezuela and Colombia. Its habitat is tropical rainforest.  It is sold commercially to collectors.

References

Danaini
Nymphalidae of South America
Butterflies described in 1847
Butterfly subspecies